is a Japanese diasporic term used in countries, particularly in North America and in Latin America, to specify the great-grandchildren of Japanese immigrants (Issei). The children of Issei are Nisei (the second generation). Sansei are the third generation, and their offspring are Yonsei. For the majority of Yonsei in the Western hemisphere, their Issei ancestors emigrated from Japan between the 1880s and 1924.

The character and uniqueness of the Yonsei is recognized in its social history.  The Yonsei are the subject of ongoing academic research in the United States and Japan.

History

The earliest organized group of Japanese emigrants settled in Mexico in 1897. Today, the four largest populations of Japanese and descendants of Japanese immigrants live in Brazil, the United States, Canada and Peru.

Yonsei is a term used in geographic areas outside Japan to specify the child of at least one Sansei (third generation) parent, who is the child of at least one Nisei (second generation), who is the child of at least one Issei parent. An Issei is a Japanese person who emigrated from Japan. Typically, if a person is Yonsei, more than one of his or her great-grandparents were born in Japan.

Brazilian Yonsei

Brazil is home to the largest Japanese population outside Japan, numbering an estimate of more than 1.5 million (including those of mixed-race or mixed-ethnicity).  The Yonsei Japanese Brazilians are a statistically significant component of that ethnic minority in that South American nation, comprising 12.95% of the Japanese Brazilian population in 1987.

American Yonsei

There are about 1.2 million people with Japanese ancestors in the United States.

The term Yonsei Japanese American refers generally to Yonsei citizens of the United States, but the term's usage is flexible—describing both emigrant and immigrant experiences. Most of the interned Japanese-Peruvian Nisei who were deported from Peru during World War II became naturalized American citizens; but they considered their naturalized children as Sansei, meaning three generations away from the emigrants who had sailed to South America at the turn of the century. From this perspective, the sons and daughters of these formerly stateless refugees would be Yonsei, even as offspring of parents who would be otherwise categorized as Issei or "first generation" immigrants would also be called Nisei.

While the Japanese Americans were the largest ethnic group in Hawai'i for more than sixty years (1900–1960), their numbers have decreased since then. The Hawaiian Yonsei don't have to be actively involved in the creation of their group ethnic identity and they tend to dichotomize their American and Japanese heritage. As of 2008, the U.S. yonsei generation had been the subject of relatively few academic studies. Notable among the literature to date on yonsei is Carrie Takahata's 2002 poem "Making Yonsei", in which she compares and contrasts the yonsei generation with previous Hawaiian Japanese generations.

The yonsei differ from previous generations of Japanese-Americans in that World War II and the internment camps which overshadowed the lives of previous generations are concepts unrelated to their daily existence. Due to a lack of obvious struggles or difficulties faced by previous generations of Japanese-Americans, the yonsei are sometimes called the "spoiled generation". The yonsei generation in Hawai'i can be compared to white Americans in the continental U.S. The yonsei have an equal, if not higher, educational, economic and political status as their continental white counterparts, and also have a low immigration rate, as Japanese immigration has declined since 1965. Also, intermarriage with non-Japanese became common in the Japanese American community in the 1960s. Intermarriage among Japanese Americans was at approximately 50% by the 1970s, and at 70% in the 1990s. This cultural distance from the original homeland results in a "symbolic" expression of ethnicity seen in both the continental white and the Hawaiian yonsei groups. Outside of the continental white population, the yonsei of Hawai'i are one of the few U.S. ethnic groups that express their ethnicity in a "symbolic" way.

While members of the sansei and yonsei generation may visit Japan, they tend to see this activity only as tourism. Japanese cultural structure is generally not present among the yonsei generation. According to a 2006 study of yonsei women in Hawai'i, this generation of Japanese-Americans tends to assert their ethnicity in such "symbolic" ways as the celebration of holidays and ceremonies associated with Japan, eating ethnic foods, and the use of Japanese middle-names. The study noted that the yonsei generation considered its ethnicity to be less important than did previous generations of Japanese-Americans. Cheryl Lynn Sullivan, an ethnic research who specializes in the Japanese-American community of California, wrote, "It is common in the Japanese American community not to consider yonsei Japanese American -- they are 'just plain Americans.' This is especially true of children who are the offspring of Japanese American-Euro-American marriages." Others celebrate their ancestry in cultural exchanges based around youth and sports events, e.g. Yonsei Basketball Association.

According to a 2011 columnist in The Rafu Shimpo of Los Angeles, "Younger Japanese Americans are more culturally American than Japanese" and "other than some vestigial cultural affiliations, a Yonsei or Gosei is simply another American."

Different organizations were created within the Japanese American community in order for the children of these Japanese American families to have a place where they could partake in different extracurricular activities, such as basketball, golf, baseball, etc. One such organization was the Yonsei Basketball Association, which was created in 1993 by Frank Kiyomura. Its mission statement is, "Our program was founded with a goal of providing a cultural exchange program for Fourth Generation Japanese-American youth from Southern California. We want to provide an opportunity for all participants to experience their heritage and cultural roots. In addition, we hope to provide a goodwill exchange of ideas and cultures by living with local Japanese families." Every year they give out scholarships to selected children from the Japanese American community and assemble both a boys' and girls' team together to send and play in a tournament in Japan.

Canadian Yonsei

Within Japanese-Canadian communities across Canada, distinct generational subgroups developed, each with different sociocultural referents, generational identity, and wartime experiences.

Peruvian Yonsei

Among the approximately 80,000 Peruvians of Japanese descent, the Yonsei Japanese Peruvians are an expanding element.

Cultural profile

Generations 

The term Nikkei (日系) encompasses all of the world's Japanese immigrants across generations.   The collective memory of the Issei and older Nisei was an image of Meiji Japan from 1870 through 1911, which contrasted sharply with the Japan that newer immigrants had more recently left. These differing attitudes, social values and associations with Japan were often incompatible with each other.  In this context, the significant differences in life experiences and opportunities has done little to mitigate the gaps which separated generational perspectives amongst their children and grandchildren.

The Yonsei, their parents, their grandparents, and their children are changing the way they look at themselves and their pattern of accommodation to the non-Japanese majority.

There are currently just over one hundred thousand British Japanese, mostly in London; but unlike other Nikkei communities elsewhere in the world, these Britons do not conventionally parse their communities in generational terms as Issei, Nisei, or Sansei. Usually in Britain, there are only Issei and Nisei anyway, since Nisei almost always marry non-Japanese, and Issei to a lesser extent.

Politics

Notable individuals 

The number of yonsei who have earned some degree of public recognition has continued to increase over time; but the quiet lives of those whose names are known only to family and friends are no less important in understanding the broader narrative of the nikkei. Although the names highlighted here are over-represented by sansei from North America, the Latin American member countries of the Pan American Nikkei Association (PANA) include Argentina, Bolivia, Brazil, Chile, Colombia, Mexico, Paraguay, Peru, Uruguay, in addition to the English-speaking United States and Canada.

 Cary Joji Fukunaga
 Warren Furutani.
 Colleen Hanabusa
 Gina Hiraizumi
 Garrett Hongo
 David Horvitz
 Grant Imahara<ref>A-Profiler Interview, Grant Imahara,"  AArisings (US). March 13, 2007.</ref>
 Brittany Ishibashi
 Travis Ishikawa
 Paul Kariya
 Guy Kawasaki
 Robert Kiyosaki

 Pedro Kumamoto
 Brandon League
 Alan Muraoka
 Jolene Purdy 
 Garret T. Sato
 Devin Setoguchi
 Samantha Sencer-Mura
 Jill Tokuda
 Don Wakamatsu
 Rachael Yamagata
 Kristi Yamaguchi

 References 

 Bibliography and other resources 
 Aoyagi-Stom, Caroline. "Yonsei Grandchildren of Nisei Vets Help Keep 'Go for Broke' Story Alive"] The Pacific Citizen (US). November 11, 2008.
 Fujioka, Janine Midori. (1989). Ethnicity and Patterns of Affectionate Behavior: An Empirical Study of Sansei and Yonsei College-Age Students Thesis (M.A. thesis). Los Angeles: University of California, Los Angeles.  OCLC 21365787
 Itoh, Keiko. (2001). The Japanese Community in Pre-War Britain: From Integration to Disintegration. Richmond, Surrey: Curzon. ;  OCLC 48937604
 McLellan, Janet. (1999). Many Petals of the Lotus: Five Asian Buddhist Communities in Toronto. Toronto: University of Toronto Press. ; ;  OCLC 43521129
 Nomura, Gail M. (1998).  "Japanese American Women," in The Reader's Companion to U.S. Women's History (Mankiller, Barbara Smith, ed.). Boston: Houghton Mifflin. ;  OCLC 43338598
 Okamura, Jonathan Y. (2008). Ethnicity and Inequality in Hawai'i. Philadelphia: Temple University Press. ; ;  OCLC 474121658
 Reidun, Renée and H. Johansen-Khan. (1987). Ethnic Identity of Sansei and Yonsei Japanese American High School Students in California and Hawaii (M.S. thesis). Davis: University of California.  OCLC 81603457
 Serafin, Steven and Alfred Bendixen. (2006).  "Hongo, Garrett (Kaoru)," in The Continuum Encyclopedia of American Literature. New York: Continuum. ;  OCLC 61478088
 Sowell, Thomas. (1981). Ethnic America: A History. New York: Basic Books. ;  OCLC 7306301
 Suzuki, David T. (1977). Nisei, Sansei, Yonsei. Vancouver : B.C. Learning Connection. OCLC: 40403168
 Takahata, Carrie. (2002). "Making Yonsei" in Okamura Jonathan (ed.) The Japanese American Contemporary Experience in Hawaii. Honolulu: University of Hawaii Press. 
 Tsukuda, Patrick Takeo. (2004). Yonsei: A Fourth Generation Reflects. Thesis (M.A.)--Portland State University. OCLC: 56637903
 Watanabe, Karin Junko. (2001). The Influence of Family Structure on the Ethnic Identity: Development of Multiracial Japanese Americans: An Exploratory Study of Yonsei in Hawaii: A Project Based Upon an Independent Investigation. Thesis (M.S.W.)--Smith College School for Social Work OCLC: 48455290

English language culture
  American Yonsei;  Hawaiian Yonsei
 Asakawa, Gil. (2004).  Being Japanese American: A JA Sourcebook for Nikkei, Happa -- & Their Friends. Berkeley, California: Stone Bridge Press. ;  OCLC  54694568
 Koskof, Ellen. (2005).  Music Cultures in the United States: An Introduction. London: Routledge. 
 Tacoma Community College Library. (1972). Issei, Nisei, Sansei, Yonsei: A Bibliography of Japanese Holdings, Including a Short List of Materials on the Japanese Internment & the U.S. Internal Security Act : a Subject, Title & Author Arrangement. Tacoma: Friends of Tacoma Community College Library.
 Tanaka, Brandi-Ann. (2000). A Yonsei from Hawai'i: Four Generations of Memories. in Skipping Stones'' (November 2000).
 Võ, Linda Trinh and Rick Bonus. (2002).  Contemporary Asian American Communities: Intersections and Divergences.  Philadelphia: Temple University Press. 
  Yonsei Grandchildren of Nisei Vets Help Keep 'Go for Broke' Story Alive
  Canadian Yonsei
 Agnew, Vijay. (2005).  Diaspora, Memory and Identity: A Search for Home. Toronto: University of Toronto Press. 
 Anderson, Jim, Maureen Kendrick, Theresa Rogers and Suzanne Smythe. (2005).  Portraits of Literacy Across Families, Communities, and Schools: Intersections and Tensions. London: Routledge. 
 Hajdukowski-Ahmed, Maroussia, Nazilla Khanlou and Helene Moussa. (2008).  Not Born a Refugee Woman: Contesting Identities, Rethinking Practices. New York: Berghahn Books.   OCLC 180755168

Portuguese language culture
  Brazilian Yonsei
 De Carvalho, Daniella. (2002).  Migrants and Identity in Japan and Brazil: The Nikkeijin. London: Routledge. 
 Lesser, Jeffrey. (2007).  A Discontented Diaspora: Japanese Brazilians and the Meanings of Ethnic Militancy, 1960-1980. Durham: Duke University Press. 

Spanish language culture
  Peruvian Yonsei
 Hirabayashi, Lane Ryo and Akemi Kikumura-Yano. (2002).  New Worlds, New Lives: Globalization and People of Japanese Descent in the Americas and from Latin America in Japan. Stanford: Stanford University Press. 
 Masterson, Daniel M and Sayaka Funada-Classen. (2003).  The Japanese in Latin America. Urbana: University of Illinois Press.

External links 
 Japanese American National Museum;  JANM generational teas
 Embassy of Japan in Washington, DC
 Japanese American Citizens League
 Japanese Cultural & Community Center of Northern California
 Japanese American Community and Cultural Center of Southern California
 Japanese American Historical Society
 Densho: The Japanese American Legacy Project
 Japanese American Museum of San Jose, California
 Japanese American Network
 Japanese-American's own companies in USA
 Photo Exhibit of Japanese American community in Florida
 Nikkei Federation
 Discover Nikkei
 Summary of a panel discussion on changing Japanese American identities

Cultural generations
Japanese-American history
Japanese diaspora
Japanese words and phrases